Prusurate is a Croatian dessert that is made for Christmas. It is made from a dough containing fruit bits and is fried in oil. It can be topped with powdered sugar or a glaze made from milk and sugar.

See also
Yugoslavian cuisine (disambiguation)
List of fried dough foods
List of doughnut varieties

References

Balkan cuisine
Christmas food
Doughnuts